The Memory of Justice is a 1976 documentary film directed by Marcel Ophuls. It explores the subject of atrocities committed in wartime and features Joan Baez, Karl Dönitz, Hermann Göring, Hans-Joachim Kulenkampff, Yehudi Menuhin, Albert Speer and Telford Taylor.

The film was inspired by Telford Taylor's 1970 book Nuremberg and Vietnam: An American Tragedy, and Taylor is interviewed extensively during the film. But Ophüls takes the book as a starting point for exploring the possibility of people judging one another, especially in light of their behavior in other contexts, as well as dealing with individual versus collective responsibility. The film discusses the notion that any group in power is capable of committing a war atrocity.

The film had a difficult genesis.  It was originally financed in the summer of 1973 by the BBC, Polytel, and a private company based in London, Visual Programme Systems (VPS), the latter of whom had wanted the film to dwell heavily on America's involvement in Vietnam and France's involvement in Algeria. The BBC and Polytel had invested on the basis of a three hour film however, after completing rough cuts, VPS was dismayed at Ophuls' work which ran to more than four hours (particularly his excessive leaning on the Nuremberg Trials and Nazi involvement) and tried to remove him as director. Hamilton Fish V organized a group of investors who were able to buy back the rights to the film from VPS and allow Ophuls to complete it.

The film was screened at the 1976 Cannes Film Festival, but wasn't entered into the main competition.

The Memory of Justice was restored by the Academy Film Archive in 2015. This restored version was screened at the Toronto International Film Festival in September 2015. and at the BFI London Film Festival in October 2015.

References

External links

 

1976 films
1976 documentary films
American documentary films
British documentary films
French documentary films
German documentary films
West German films
1970s French-language films
Documentary films about war crimes
Films directed by Marcel Ophuls
Films produced by David Puttnam
1970s American films
1970s British films
1970s French films
1970s German films